Freda Warfield is an American politician who served as a member of the Kansas House of Representatives, as the representative of the 58th district in Topeka, Kansas, from 2019 to 2021. She was selected by Democratic Party precinct committee members on December 27, 2018, to succeed Democratic Rep. Vic Miller, who had been picked by precinct committee members to succeed Democratic Sen. Laura Kelly, who was resigning from the Senate after her election as Governor of Kansas. Warfield's election was to fill the two-year term Miller had won in the 2018 election.

Warfield defeated former Rep. Ben Scott by a vote of 20–4 to succeed Miller in the House of Representatives.  Warfield is a retired employee of the Kansas Department of Revenue. She did not seek reelection in 2020.

2019–2020 Kansas House of Representatives Committee assignments
Agriculture and Natural Resources Budget
Veterans and Military
Taxation

References

Living people
Democratic Party members of the Kansas House of Representatives
21st-century American politicians
21st-century American women politicians
Women state legislators in Kansas
People from Topeka, Kansas
Year of birth missing (living people)